Voyage au pays des arbres is a novel written in French by French Nobel laureate J. M. G. Le Clézio. A little boy is bored and dreams of traveling deep into the forest, where he meets a profound old oak and gets invited to a party by some young trees.

Theme

References

1978 children's books
Works by J. M. G. Le Clézio